Alain Bettagno (born 9 November 1968 in Belgium) is a Belgian retired footballer.

He earned two caps with the Belgium national team.

Career
Bettagno started his career with Seraing, the club his father supported, and was one of a few youth graduates from the club. After relegation to the Belgian second division, he stayed with the team on his father's wishes despite offers from the top division. In 1988, he signed for Bruges for twelve million francs, which saved Seraing from bankruptcy. However, his career was blighted by injuries, including one in the 1993 Belgian Cup final, which caused him to miss the 1994 World Cup.

References

External links
 
 
 

Living people
1968 births
Belgian footballers
Belgium international footballers
Association football wingers
Association football midfielders
Club Brugge KV players
Standard Liège players
FC Linz players
FC Gueugnon players
R.A.A. Louviéroise players
RFC Liège players
R.C.S. Verviétois players
Belgian Pro League players
Challenger Pro League players
Austrian Football Bundesliga players
Ligue 2 players
Belgian Third Division players
Belgian expatriate footballers
Belgian expatriate sportspeople in Austria
Belgian expatriate sportspeople in France
Expatriate footballers in Austria
Expatriate footballers in France
People from Seraing
Footballers from Liège Province